Jon Ashton (born 4 August 1979) is an English former footballer who played as a defender. He made 47 appearances in the Football League for Plymouth Argyle and Exeter City. He also played non-league football for Hayes and Dulwich Hamlet

Playing career
Ashton was born in Plymouth. He began his career with Plymouth Argyle and made his first team debut in August 1997. In three seasons with the club, he made 44 appearances in all competitions before joining Exeter City in the summer of 2000. Ashton played in 13 league games during one season with the club, and then spent a year with Hayes, where he made 22 appearances in all competitions. He went on to play for Dulwich Hamlet, Bodmin Town, Bridgwater Town and Paulton Rovers. Retired due to an Achilles injury aged 26. Working in the financial services sector since 2003.

References

1979 births
Living people
Footballers from Plymouth, Devon
English footballers
Association football defenders
Plymouth Argyle F.C. players
Exeter City F.C. players
Hayes F.C. players
Dulwich Hamlet F.C. players
Bodmin Town F.C. players
Bridgwater Town F.C. players
Paulton Rovers F.C. players
English Football League players
National League (English football) players